Cruel & Delicious is an album from Fatso Jetson. It was released on November 30, 2002, by Rekords Rekords.

Track listing

Personnel
Mario Lalli – guitar, vocals
Tony Tornay – drums
Larry Lalli – bass
Additional musicians
Jesse Hughes – guitar, vocals
Schneebie – organ, electric piano, vocals
Vince Meghrouni – harmonica, tenor, alto sax

Credits
Recorded & Mixed at Donner & Blitzen, Silver Lake, California

Produced by Mathias Schneeberger & Fatso Jetson

"Ton O Love" words and music by G. V. Casale/Devo

Cover Photography by Tony Tornay

Inside Booklet Photography by Patrick Krausgrill

References

Fatso Jetson albums
2002 albums